Donegall may refer to:

 Donegall Lectureship at Trinity College Dublin, lectureship in mathematics at TCD
 Donegall Square, a square in the centre of Belfast, County Antrim, Northern Ireland 
 Donegall Road, a residential area and road thoroughfare in west Belfast
 Donegall Arms shooting, attack by a small Irish Republican paramilitary group in December 1991
 Donegall Pass, a place on the Ormeau Road in south Belfast
 Marquess of Donegall, Irish peerages associated with County Donegal
 Donegall Street bombing, Provisional IRA car bombing in Belfast on 20 March, 1972

See also
 Donegal (disambiguation)